Leo Vernon Bensemann  (1 May 1912 – 2 January 1986) was a New Zealand artist, printer, typographer, publisher and editor.

Bensemenn was born in Tākaka, New Zealand, on 1 May 1912. He moved to Christchurch in 1931 with his friend Lawrence Baigent. In February 1938, Bensemann and Baigent moved into a flat at 97 Cambridge Terrace where artist Rita Angus was living. On Angus's nomination he joined The Group in 1938. Seven of the nine works he submitted to this exhibition were portraits – including a self-portrait, a portrait of Rita Angus and one of Lawrence Baigent.

In 1937 the Caxton Press printed their first art publication, Bensemann's “Fantastica: Thirteen Drawings”. Bensemann assisted with the printing of the book and this led to his joining Caxton Press in 1938. He stayed with Caxton until 1978.

In the 1985 New Year Honours, Bensemann was appointed an Officer of the Order of the British Empire, for services to art, literature and printing.

References

1912 births
1986 deaths
People educated at Nelson College
20th-century New Zealand male artists
New Zealand publishers (people)
New Zealand writers
New Zealand Officers of the Order of the British Empire
People from Tākaka
People associated with The Group (New Zealand art)
New Zealand printmakers
New Zealand illustrators